Jucikas is a surname. Notable people with the surname include:

Julius Jucikas (born 1989), Lithuanian basketball player
Matas Jucikas (born 1994), Lithuanian basketball player